A documentary is a nonfictional film or video production.  

Documentary may also refer to:

 Radio documentary
 Television documentary
 Documentary photography

See also

 
 Document
 List of documentary films
 Documentary Channel (disambiguation)
 The Documentary, a 2005 album by The Game